Major facilitator superfamily domain containing 4A is a protein belonging to the MFS Pfam clan. It is an atypical solute carrier, thus a plausible SLC transporter in humans. MFSD4A has been identified in both central and peripheral areas.

References 

Protein superfamilies
Solute carrier family